The Jardin botanique du Château de Vauville (4 hectares), also known as the Jardin botanique de Vauville, is a private botanical garden located on the grounds of the Château de Vauville near Beaumont-Hague in Vauville, Manche, Normandy, France. It is open afternoons in the warmer months; an admission fee is charged.

The garden was begun by Eric Pellerin in 1948 on a windy site located within 300 meters of the Atlantic Ocean. Today it contains more than 900 semi-tropical species of plants from the Southern Hemisphere set within windbreaks of diverse eucalyptus and bamboo. Collections include aloes, Dimorphotheca, Echium pininana, and palm trees.

See also 
 List of botanical gardens in France

References 
 Jardin botanique du Château de Vauville
 French Gardening description
 Parcs et Jardins de France description (French)
 Parcs et Jardins de Normandie description (French)
 Conservatoire des Jardins et Paysages description (French)

External links

Gardens in Manche
Botanical gardens in France